The Aquitanian is, in the ICS' geologic timescale, the oldest age or lowest stage in the Miocene. It spans the time between 23.03 ± 0.05 Ma and 20.43 ± 0.05 Ma (million years ago) during the Early Miocene. It is a dry, cooling period. The Aquitanian succeeds the Chattian (the youngest age of the Oligocene) and precedes the Burdigalian.

The Aquitanian Age overlaps with the Harrisonian, Agenian, Pareora, Landon, Otaian, and Waitakian Ages from various regional timescales.

Stratigraphic definition
The Aquitanian Stage was named after the region Aquitaine in France and was introduced in scientific literature by Swiss stratigrapher Karl Mayer-Eymar in 1858.

The base of the Aquitanian (also the base of the Miocene Series and the Neogene System) is defined as the place in the stratigraphic column at the first appearance of foram species Paragloborotalia kugleri, the extinction of calcareous nanoplankton species Reticulofenestra bisecta (which forms the base of nanoplankton biozone NN1), and the base of magnetic chronozone C6Cn.2n. The official GSSP for the Aquitanian Stage lies in the Lemme-Carrosio section near the small village of Carrosio (north of Genoa) in northern Italy.

The top of the Aquitanian Stage (the base of the Burdigalian) is at the first appearance of foram species Globigerinoides altiaperturus and the top of magnetic chronozone C6An.

References

Footnotes

Literature

; 2004: A Geologic Time Scale 2004, Cambridge University Press.
; 1858: Versuch einer neuen Klassifikation der Tertiär-Gebilde Europa’s, Verhandlungen der Schweizerischen Naturforschenden Gesellschaft 17–19 (August 1857), p. 70–71 & 165–199. 
; 1997: The Global Stratotype Section and Point (GSSP) for the base of the Neogene, Episodes 20(1), p. 23-28.

External links
GeoWhen Database - Aquitanian
Neogene timescale, at the website of the subcommission for stratigraphic information of the ICS
 Neogene timescale at the website of the Norwegian network of offshore records of geology and stratigraphy

 
01
Miocene geochronology
Geological ages